Second Presbyterian Church is a historic church building at Tenth Avenue and Twelfth Street South in Birmingham, Alabama.  It was built in 1901 and added to the National Register of Historic Places in 1986. It is now used as the University of Alabama at Birmingham honors house.

References

Presbyterian churches in Alabama
Churches on the National Register of Historic Places in Alabama
National Register of Historic Places in Birmingham, Alabama
Romanesque Revival church buildings in Alabama
Churches completed in 1901
Churches in Birmingham, Alabama